Lake Bekihatso is a crescent-shaped lake slightly more than  west of US 191 in Apache County, Arizona. This lake is in very uneven and isolated desertlike terrain. Bekihatso is a name derived from the Navajo language meaning "big pond".

See also
 List of lakes in Arizona

References

Lakes of Apache County, Arizona
Lakes of Arizona
Arizona placenames of Native American origin